Lincoln Unified School District is located in Stockton, California and serves more than 9,200 students at 13 "learning centers" throughout the northwestern region of the city.

School Board
Starting with the 2014 elections, there are five trustee voting areas.  Trustees serve four-year terms with a two-term limit (effective November 2000).

The Board typically meets the second and fourth Wednesdays of the month.  Most regular meetings begin with a closed session of the Board directly following Call to Order.  The Board resumes open session at 7:30 p.m. unless otherwise posted. Additional meetings may be called as necessary.

Schools
The school district encompasses 13 "learning centers", the first of which, named Lincoln Elementary, a one-room country school, opened on the corner of an empty field five miles north of Stockton in 1878 and still exists today, although it has undergone a complete renovation.

The district serves more than 9,200 students with one comprehensive high school, one alternative high schools, an independent learning center (grades 9-12), one middle school (7-8), two elementary schools serving grades K-6, one charter school specializing in Science, Technology, Engineering and Math, serving grades TK-8, and six elementary schools serving grades K-8.

High schools
 Lincoln High School (9-12)
 Village Oaks High School (9-12)

Middle schools
 Sierra Middle School (7-8)

Elementary schools

K-8 schools
 Brookside
 Claudia Landeen
 Colonial Heights
 Mable Barron
 Don Riggio
 Tully C. Knoles

K-6 schools
 John R. Williams
 Lincoln Elementary

Charter Schools
 John McCandless Charter School

Other Facilities
 Independent Learning Center (9-12)

References

External links
 

School districts in San Joaquin County, California
Education in Stockton, California